Green nail syndrome, is a paronychial infection caused due to Pseudomonas aeruginosa that can develop in individuals whose hands are frequently submerged in water. It may also occur as transverse green stripes that are ascribed to intermittent episodes of infection.

It is most commonly caused by the bacteria “Pseudomonas Aeruginosa”, which thrives in moist conditions. Green Nail Syndrome is linked to regular submergence of one's hands in water, detergents and soils. There are several activities and injuries that are linked to predisposition in contracting the condition.

Symptoms and signs
The most common symptom of Green Nail Syndrome is the discolouration of the infected nail as it turns a dark green colour, due to the bacteria secreting the green pigments Pyoverdin and Pyocyanin. The patient can also experience tenderness surrounding the infected nail along with redness and swelling.

Causes 
Green Nail Syndrome is caused by exposing the nail to the bacterial organism, which leads to opportunistic infection. These bacteria are typically found in water sources and soil. They grow and multiply rapidly in moist environments such as sinks, swimming pools and sponges.

The seal between the nail and finger acts as a physical barrier to prevent this kind of infection, however hyper-hydration or destruction of the epidermis can impair the barrier, allowing the colonisation of the bacteria.

It is possible for a patient to transfer Green Nail Syndrome from an infected nail to a non-infected nail via self-inoculation, in transferring the bacteria to a new infection site.

Predispositions 
Those working in jobs requiring them to have their hands submerged in water or soil for prolonged periods of time on a regular basis. These include housewives, dishwashers, bakers, barbers, medical personnel and farmers. Patients in hospital for non-related issues have contracted the infection, indicating that Green Nail Syndrome can be a hospital acquired infection.

The elderly and people who have had trauma to a finger or nail are predisposed to contracting Green Nail Syndrome. Patients who already have nail diseases such as onycholysis and onychotillomania are at higher risk of contracting Green Nail Syndrome.

Predisposition to Green Nail Syndrome has also been linked to manicures, heat, dermatitis, ulcerations. Occlusions and excess sweating. Higher risk of contracting the infection is also linked to soccer players and military personnel due to the prolonged periods of time in which they exercise while wear tight fitting shoes as well as immunosuppressed persons and those with weakened epidermis barrier.

Bacteria 

Pseudomonas Aeruginosa species of bacteria are the most common causes of Green Nail Syndrome. Nail scrapings have identified Aspergillus, Candida and Klebsiella Pneumoniae species present at the infected nail site. It is unsure whether these are causative organisms or simply coinfections alongside Pseudomonas Aeruginosa.

Diagnosis 
Diagnosis can typically be made from a physical examination of the nail. If necessary, a gram stain or bacteriological culture of nail scrapings can be performed in order to identify the presence of bacteria.

There are shortcomings however in conducting a culture because the infection can be present a distance from the nail site, and as a result return a false negative result. A sample of infected nail can be submerged in distilled water to perform a pigment solubility test, within 24 hours the liquid will turn blue green in colour indicating the presence of Pseudomonas Aeruginosa.

Differential diagnosis 
Green Nail Syndrome can be misdiagnosed with Aspergillus infections, Malignant melanoma, Subungual hematomas. The use of green dye, paint or chemical lacquers can also lead to confusion.

Treatment 
Treatment for Green Nail Syndrome varies greatly depending on the severity of the infection and the length of time it has been present. There are many medically approved options when a patient is treated by a medical professional. For persons who are unable to seek medical help there are also alternative treatments that have been trialled successfully.

Medical Treatment 
There are several medical treatment options, depending on the severity of the infection and how long it has been present. The least invasive treatment includes soaking the nail in alcohol and regularly trimming the nail back, to dry out the area and prevent bacterial colonisation. Moderate cases of Green Nail Syndrome are prescribed topical antibiotics (silver sulfadiazine, gentamicin, ciprofloxacin, bacitracin and polymyxin B) or oral antibiotics (ciprofloxacin), antiseptic creams, tobramycin eye drops have also been reported to be effective. In severe cases, surgical removal of the infected nail may be required. The patient should always avoid further trauma to the infected nail regardless of the stage of treatment they received.

Alternative Treatment 
Some at-home treatments have been successfully trialled in treating mild cases of Green Nail Syndrome. Soaking the nails in vinegar or a chlorine bleach solution (diluted with water 1:4) at regular intervals can be used when medical help is not accessible to the patient.

Prevention 
Preventative measures should be implemented by those who are most at risk of contracting Green Nail Syndrome due to their predisposition or lifestyle and workplace choices. Wearing waterproof gloves or gum boots can be effective in preventing prolonged exposure of the nails to water. Avoiding trauma that could lead to the destruction of the epidermis seal is on the nails is a priority in preventing green nail syndrome recurrences.

Patient management and recovery 
In mild to moderate cases, where the infection clears with minimal medical intervention, the patient should ensure the nail is kept clean and dry and avoid hyper-hydration. Humid climates could lead to a longer recovery than dry climes due to inability to expose the site to very dry air. In cases where surgery is necessary, patients should follow their medical professional's post-surgery advice.

Cases

Green nail syndrome in nail salons 
Pseudomonas can be transferred among clients in a nail salon if appropriate hygiene standards are not up kept. While the bacteria wouldn't typically survive on the nail shaping equipment, unclean conditions could allow for it to transfer from equipment to client's nails repeatedly. When technicians are presented with a client that has suspected green nail syndrome, they shouldn't continue the normal treatment of painting nails, applying acrylic nails or otherwise. This is due to the application of liquids and oils creating an environment which the bacteria be trapped and treatment will not be possible without the removal of these polishes. As chief science advisor at CND Doug Schoon states “it creates a nearly oxygen free environment, which these bacteria just love”. Nail technicians are not qualified to treat green nail syndrome and should educate the client on the condition and encourage them to seek medical treatment before returning to the nail salon.

Green nail syndrome and working with chemicals 
A man working with in a job where he was regularly mixing chemicals developed green nail syndrome. While he mostly wore latex gloves, he reported they would become moist and often he would remove them to clean his hands and utensils. The combination of moisture within his gloves and contact with chemicals caused his nails to lift from the nail bed. He developed severe green nail syndrome and was treated with topical antibiotics, which cleared up the infection within 6 months. It was noted that latex gloves were not suitable for his line of work and more robust rubber gloves should be used.

Green nail syndrome and Basel Cell Carcinomas 
There have been cases where a Basel Cell Carcinoma has been present in conjunction with Green Nail Syndrome. Carcinomas are not common in the area surrounding the nail bed. However, if a Carcinoma is suspected in conjunction with or in place of green nail syndrome, a biopsy should be conducted immediately. The Indian Journal of Dermatology states "Early diagnosis can enable the physician to render simpler nondestructive modalities of treatment. In this article, we describe such a case of longstanding BCC of this region mimicking a traumatic ulcer".

Green nail syndrome transfer within hospitals 
Medical professionals with Green Nail Syndrome have been reported to have transferred the infection to patients in hospitals. Five surgical site infections during 2001 were linked to a cardiac surgeon with the infection who didn't routinely use double gloves. The surgeon's infected nail was surgically removed and no further transfers of the infection were reported.

See also 
 Green nails
 List of cutaneous conditions

References

Further reading

External links
 Green nail syndrome on American Osteopathic Association (AOCD) website

Conditions of the skin appendages
Bacterium-related cutaneous conditions
Syndromes